Ludlamite is a rare phosphate mineral with chemical formula . It was first described in 1877 for an occurrence in Wheal Jane mine in Cornwall, England and named for English mineralogist Henry Ludlam (1824–1880).

Occurrence
It occurs in granite pegmatites and as a hydrothermal alteration product of earlier phosphate bearing minerals in a reducing environment. It occurs associated with whitlockite, vivianite, triploidite, triplite, triphylite, siderite, phosphoferrite, fairfieldite and apatite.

References

External links

Phosphate minerals
Monoclinic minerals
Minerals in space group 14